Charles Thomas was a Negro league catcher in the 1920s.

Thomas made his Negro leagues debut in 1920 with the Baltimore Black Sox. He went on to play three seasons with Baltimore through 1922.

References

External links
  and Seamheads

Place of birth missing
Place of death missing
Year of birth missing
Year of death missing
Baltimore Black Sox players
Baseball catchers